Patrick Dever (born 5 September 1996) is a British long-distance runner. 
In 2019, he competed in the senior men's race at the 2019 IAAF World Cross Country Championships held in Aarhus, Denmark. He finished in 37th place. He runs for the University of Tulsa and finished 5th at the 2020 NCAA Division I Cross Country Championships in 30:00.0 for the 10,000 metres. He won the 2021 NCAA Division I Outdoor Track and Field Championships in the 10,000 metres.

References

External links 
 

1996 births
Living people
British Athletics Championships winners
British male cross country runners
British male long-distance runners
British male middle-distance runners
People from Leyland, Lancashire
Place of birth missing (living people)
Tulsa Golden Hurricane men's track and field athletes